Elisabeth Biebl, also Elisabeth Biebl von Klipstein-Sporrer (8 May 1915 – 4 December 1989) was a German operetta singer and actress.

Life and career 
Born in Munich, Beibl appeared as a child at the Bavarian State Opera, where she received training as a dancer. From 1930 to 1931 she was engaged as such at the Staatstheater am Gärtnerplatz, then for a year at the Bayerische Musikbühne, a travelling company. She then studied music and singing in her hometown. Her musical career began as an operetta soubrette at the Stadttheater Fürth, to which she belonged from 1934 to 1938. In 1940 she changed to the Staatstheater am Gärtnerplatz.

There she performed in 1942 under 's direction in the musical comedy "Gitta". In the 1950s and 1960s she was a highly acclaimed star at the aforementioned theatre, where she played alongside Harry Friedauer, Rosl Schwaiger, Dorothea Chryst, Ferry Gruber, Martha Kunig-Rinach and others and belonged to the permanent ensemble until 1978. Furthermore Biebl took part in some (TV) movies. She also played a part in the 1951 Border Post 58 film.
 
Biebl was married three times, including to the operetta singer Hans-Heinz Bollmann and Ernst von Klipstein, whom she met during the shooting of Die drei Dorfheiligen.

Biebl died in Munich at age 79 and is buried at Munich Waldfriedhof.

References

Literature 
 Bayerisches Staatstheater am Gärtnerplatz (publisher): 100 Jahre Theater am Gärtnerplatz München, Munich 1965

External links 
 Grave
 

1915 births
1989 deaths
Actresses from Munich
German film actresses
German sopranos
20th-century German actresses
20th-century German women singers